Marutha may refer to:
Marutha, India, a village in Nilambur taluk of Malappuram district
Marutha of Tikrit (565–649), West Syrian Maphrian
Aana Marutha, a mythological evil spirit popular in Kerala, India
Marutha (film), a 2022 Tamil-language film

See also
Maruthas, 5th-century Christian saint and bishop of Martyropolis